The Weymouth Township School District is a public school district that serves students in pre-kindergarten through eighth grade from Weymouth Township, in Atlantic County, New Jersey, United States.

As of the 2020–21 school year, the district, comprised of one school, had an enrollment of 145 students and 15.8 classroom teachers (on an FTE basis), for a student–teacher ratio of 9.2:1. In the 2016–17 school year, Weymouth was tied with the 30th smallest enrollment of any school district in the state, with 155 students.

The district is classified by the New Jersey Department of Education as being in District Factor Group "B", the second-lowest of eight groupings. District Factor Groups organize districts statewide to allow comparison by common socioeconomic characteristics of the local districts. From lowest socioeconomic status to highest, the categories are A, B, CD, DE, FG, GH, I and J.

For ninth through twelfth grades, public school students attend Buena Regional High School as part of a sending/receiving relationship with the Buena Regional School District. Students attend the high school from Buena and Buena Vista Township, along with students from Estell Manor, who attend as part of a sending/receiving relationship. As of the 2020–21 school year, the high school had an enrollment of 535 students and 51.0 classroom teachers (on an FTE basis), for a student–teacher ratio of 10.5:1.

School
Weymouth Township Elementary School had an enrollment of 143 students in grades PreK-8 in the 2020–21 school year.

Administration
Core members of the district's administration are:
Alfred Lewis, Superintendent
John Hansen, School Business Administrator / Board Secretary

Board of education
The district's board of education, comprised of nine members, sets policy and oversees the fiscal and educational operation of the district through its administration. As a Type II school district, the board's trustees are elected directly by voters to serve three-year terms of office on a staggered basis, with three seats up for election each year held (since 2012) as part of the November general election. The board appoints a superintendent to oversee the district's day-to-day operations and a business administrator to supervise the business functions of the district.

References

External links
Weymouth Township School District
 
Data for the Weymouth Township School District, National Center for Education Statistics

New Jersey District Factor Group B
School districts in Atlantic County, New Jersey
Weymouth Township, New Jersey
Public K–8 schools in New Jersey